Valentina Yakshina (born 6 February 1976) is a Russian speed skater. She competed at the 2002 Winter Olympics and the 2006 Winter Olympics.

References

1976 births
Living people
Russian female speed skaters
Olympic speed skaters of Russia
Speed skaters at the 2002 Winter Olympics
Speed skaters at the 2006 Winter Olympics
Sportspeople from Saint Petersburg